Sagaram Sakshi is a 1994 Malayalam film  directed by Sibi Malayil. It stars Mammootty in the lead role, with Sukanya and Thilakan in supporting roles. A. K. Lohithadas wrote the screenplay for this film. This was the last film of Sibi Malayil-Lohithadas combination.

Cast
 Mammootty as Balachandran
 Sukanya as Nirmala
 Thilakan as Menon
 Oduvil Unnikrishnan as Narayanan
 Zeenath
 Kundara Johnny as K. K. Nair (Villain)
 Cochin Haneefa as Sudhakaran
 Sreejaya Nair 
 Valsala Menon 
 Bindu Panicker
 Ravi Vallathol
 N. F. Varghese as Krishnakumar
 Aranmula Ponnamma
 Vijayakumar
 Santhakumari
 Dileep

Soundtrack
Sharreth has composed the original score for the movie.

References

External links
 

1990s Malayalam-language films
1993 films
Films about terrorism in India
Films directed by Sibi Malayil
Films with screenplays by A. K. Lohithadas
Films scored by Sharreth